Calvin Harrison may refer to:
 Calvin Harrison (athlete)
 Calvin Harrison (cricketer)

See also
 Calvin Harris, Scottish DJ